Majdian (also Romanized as Majdīān, Majdeyān, and Majdiyan) is a village in Salehan Rural District, in the Central District of Khomeyn County, Markazi Province, Iran. At the 2006 census, its population was 36, in 13 families.

References 

Populated places in Khomeyn County